R77 may refer to:

 R-77, a Russian air-to-air missile
 R-77 Gablingen, a former military airfield in Germany
 , an aircraft carrier laid down for the Royal Navy
 Small nucleolar RNA Z102/R77